The Monarch Initiative is a large scale bioinformatics web resource focused on leveraging existing biomedical knowledge to connect genotypes with phenotypes in an effort to aid research that combats genetic diseases.
Monarch does this by integrating multi-species genotype, phenotype, genetic variant and disease knowledge from various existing biomedical data resources into a centralized and structured database.  While this integration process has been traditionally done manually by basic researchers and clinicians on a case-by-case basis, The Monarch Initiative provides an aggregated and structured collection of data and tools that make biomedical knowledge exploration more efficient and effective.

Mondo ontology 
Mondo ontology is product of the Monarch Initiative. It provides ontology for diseases and disorders, both rare and common.

References

External links 

 Mouse Genome Informatics
 Zebrafish Information Network
 WormBase database of nematode biology
 FlyBase
 International Mouse Phenotyping Consortium
 Mouse Phenome Database
 Online Mendelian Inheritance in Animals
 ClinVar
 Mendelian Inheritance in Man
 ORPHANET
 Protein ANalysis THrough Evolutionary Relationships Classification System
 Coriell Institute for Medical Research
 Comparative Toxicogenomics Database
 Human Phenotype Ontology
 Kyoto Encyclopedia of Genes and Genomes
 MyGene.info
 National Center for Biotechnology Information
 BioGRID
 GWAS Catalog
 AnimalQTLdb
 Ensembl database of automatically annotated genomic data
 Gene Ontology Database
 Gene Reviews
 HUGO Gene Nomenclature Committee
 Mutant Mouse Resource and Research Centers
 Reactome - a curated knowledgebase of biological pathways
 Undiagnosed Diseases Program (UDP)
 STRING

Biological databases
Ontology (information science)